Sternlicht is a surname. Notable people with the surname include: 

Adrienne Sternlicht (born 1993), American show jumping rider
Barry Sternlicht (born 1960), American billionaire businessman